Kalikave is a small village in Kuravilangad Panchayath, Meenachil taluk of Kottayam district.

References

Villages in Kottayam district